The Asia Japan Okinawa Open was a men's professional golf tournament that was co-sanctioned by the Asian Tour and the Japan Golf Tour. It was played each December from 2002 to 2005 and counted as the first official money event of the following season for both tours, that is for example the 2005 event was part of the 2006 season. The prize fund was US$830,000 each of the first two years.

Tournament hosts

Winners

Earlier tournament
An earlier Okinawa Open was played at Awase Meadows golf course from 1961 until 1972.
1972 Chen Chien-chin
1971 Hung Fa
1970 Hiroshi Nomiyama
1969 Chang Tung-chan
1968 Frank Kadota
1967 Chen Chien-chin
1966 Hsu Sheng-san
1965 Bick Long
1964 Finegan Higa
1963 Kuo Chie Hsiung
1962 Kuo Chie Hsiung
1961 Horace Meredith

Notes

References

External links
Coverage on the Japan Golf Tour's official site (2003–2006) 

Defunct golf tournaments in Japan
Former Asian Tour events
Former Japan Golf Tour events
Sports competitions in Okinawa Prefecture
Recurring sporting events established in 2002
Recurring sporting events disestablished in 2005